Artaise-le-Vivier is a commune in the Ardennes department in the Ardennes region of northern France.

Geography
Artaise-le-Vivier is located some 25 km south-east of Charleville-Mézières and 15 km south by south-west of Sedan. Access to the commune is by the D24 road from Chémery-sur-Bar in the north-west passing through the commune and the village and continuing to join the D30 south-east of the commune. The D324 road also comes by an indirect route from La Neuville-à-Maire in the west to the village. The southern quarter of the commune is forested with the rest farmland.

The Ruisseau de Terron with its tributaries rises in the south of the commune and flows north-west forming part of the western border before continuing north-west to join the Bar near Malmy. The Ruisseau de Charlier forms part of the eastern border of the commune before flowing west through the centre to join the Ruisseau de Terron on the western border.

Neighbouring communes and villages

Heraldry

Administration

List of Successive Mayors

Demography
In 2017 the commune had 66 inhabitants.

Sites and monuments

The Church of Saint-Georges contains a Statue of Saint Georges (18th century) which is registered as an historical object.
The Raminoise fortified house

Picture Gallery

See also
Communes of the Ardennes department

References

External links
Artaise-le-Vivier on the National Geographic Institute website 
3 Cantons official website 
Artaise-le-Vivier on Géoportail, National Geographic Institute (IGN) website 
Artaife and le Vivier on the 1750 Cassini Map

 

Communes of Ardennes (department)